Hymn meter, in Western liturgy and literature, is the general metrical scheme in which hymns are recited or sung. Three metrical schemes are generally recognized, all (usually) in four-line stanzas rhyming a-b-c-b (or a-b-a-b).

English minister and hymn writer Isaac Watts, who wrote hundreds of hymns and was instrumental in the widespread use of hymns in public worship in England, is credited with popularizing and formalizing these meters, which were based on English folk poems, particularly ballads.

Common metre
Common metre has alternating lines of iambic tetrameter and iambic trimeter organized in four-line stanzas. This is also called ballad meter, since many English ballads employ this structure.

Examples
"Amazing Grace":

Amazing grace, how sweet the sound
that saved a wretch like me.
I once was lost, but now am found,
was blind, but now I see.

Long metre
In long metre, stanzas consist of lines of iambic tetrameter.

Examples
"When I Survey the Wondrous Cross":

When I survey the wondrous Cross
On which the Prince of Glory dyd,
My richest Gain I count but Loss,
And pour Contempt on all my Pride.

Short metre
Short meter has two lines of iambic trimeter, a line of iambic tetrameter, and a final line of iambic trimeter.

See also
 Metre (hymn)

References

Musical notation
Hymnology
European rhythm